Tiree is the most westerly island in the Inner Hebrides of Scotland.

The land is highly fertile, and crofting, alongside tourism, and fishing are the main sources of employment for the islanders. Tiree, along with Colonsay, enjoys a relatively high number of total hours of sunshine during the late spring and early summer compared to the average for the United Kingdom. Tiree is a popular windsurfing venue; it is sometimes referred to as "Hawaii of the north". In most years, the Tiree World Classic surfing event is held here. People native to the island are known as Tirisdich.

History 

Tiree is known for the 1st-century-AD  broch, for the prehistoric carved Ringing Stone and for the birds of the  headland.

, abbot of Iona Abbey 679–704, recorded several stories relating to St Columba and the island of Tiree.

In one story, Columba warned a monk called Berach not to sail directly from Iona to Tiree, and instead to take a different route, and the monk went against his advice and sailed directly, but along the way, a huge whale came out of the sea and almost destroyed their boat. Columba gave the same warning to  who replied that both he and the whale were in God's hands, and Columba told him to go because his faith would save him. And  set off for Tiree, and when the whale appeared, he raised his hands and blessed it and it went back down into the ocean.

In another story,  claimed there to be a monastery on the island of Tiree that was called Artchain. Columba took issue at Aed Dub's ordination because he had previously killed a number of men, and prophesied that Aed Dub would ultimately leave the priesthood and return to his sinful life as a murderer, only to be killed violently himself.

In another story,  claimed that  asked Columba to pray for a good wind to get him to Tiree, and it was given to him, and he crossed the sea from Iona to Tiree with full sail. In another story, Columba instructed a particular monk to go to the monastery on Tiree and do penance for seven years. In another story, Columba banished some demons from Iona who then went to the island of Tiree to afflict the monks there instead.  also records there being more than one monastery on Tiree in that time period, and that  had been abbot of one of these monasteries.

Writing in 1549, Donald Munro, High Dean of the Isles wrote of "Thiridh" that it was: .

In 1770, half of the island was held by fourteen farmers who had drained land for hay and pasture. Instead of exporting live cattle (which were often exhausted by the long journey to market and so fetched low prices), they began to export salt beef in barrels to get better prices. The rest of the island was let to 45 groups of tenants on co-operative joint farms: agricultural organisations probably dating from clan times. Field strips were allocated by annual ballot. Sowing and harvesting dates were decided communally. It is reported that in 1774, Tiresians were 'well-clothed and well-fed, having an abundance of corn and cattle'.

Tiree provided the monastic community on the island of Iona, southeast of the island, with grain. A number of early monasteries once existed on Tiree itself, and several sites have stone cross-slabs from this period, such as St Patrick's Chapel,  (NL 938 401) and Soroby (NL 984 416).

A large Royal Air Force station was built on Tiree during World War II 
The weather observations from squadron 518 collected helped inform Group Captain James Martin Stagg's recommendation to General Dwight D. Eisenhower to delay the launching of the D-Day invasion of Normandy from 5 June to 6 June 1944. The airfield became Tiree Airport in 1947. These were preceded by a temporary RAF Advanced Chain Home radar station at Port Mor and an RAF Chain Home Beam radar station at Barrapol.

Geology 
Tiree is formed largely from gneiss forming the Lewisian complex, a suite of metamorphic rocks of Archaean to early Proterozoic age. Granite of Archaean age is found locally. Igneous intrusions of dolerite, felsite, lamprophyre and diorite of Palaeozoic age are encountered in places. The eastern part of the island is traversed by numerous normal faults most of which run broadly northwest–southeast. Quaternary sediments include raised beach deposits which are extensive across the island and incorporate areas of alluvium locally. There are considerable areas of blown sand in the west and behind the major bays elsewhere.

Geography 

The main village on Tiree is Scarinish.

Settlements

OS settlements 
Places classified as settlements by the Ordnance Survey include:
 Balemartine
 Balephetrish
 Balephuil
 Balevullin
 Balinoe
 Barrapol
 Baugh
 Caolas
 Cornaigbeg
 Cornaigmore
 Crossapol
 Gott
 Heanish
 Heylipol
 Hough
 Hynish
 Kenovay
 Kilkenneth
 Kilmoluaig
 Kirkapol
 Mannal
 Middleton
 Moss
 Ruaig
 Salum
 Sandaig
 Scarinish
 Sraid Ruadh
 Vaul
 West Hynish

Not OS settlements 
These places aren't classified as settlements by the Ordnance Survey but are shown on the A-Z Great Britain Road atlas 2022
 Carnan
 Miodar

Transport 

Caledonian MacBrayne operate a ferry to Scarinish. The daily crossing from Oban on the mainland takes four hours. A call is made at Arinagour on Coll and once a week the ferry crosses to Castlebay on Barra. More limited services operate in Winter.

Tiree Airport is located at Crossapol. Loganair  provide daily flights to Glasgow International and Hebridean Air Services fly to Coll and Oban.

Roads on Tiree, in common with many other small islands, are nearly all single-track roads. There are passing places, locally called 'pockets', where cars must wait to enable oncoming traffic to pass or overtake.

Climate 

As with the rest of western Scotland, Tiree experiences a maritime climate (Cfb) with cool summers and mild winters. Despite its being on the same latitude as Labrador on the opposite side of the Atlantic Ocean, snow and frost are rare, and short-lived when they occur. Weather data is collected at the island's airport. The lowest temperature to occur in recent years was  during the cold spell of December 2010. The extreme maritime moderation contributes to summer temperatures that are far below even coastal locations in continental Europe on similar latitudes. Winter temperatures are similar to those of coastal southern England.

Economy 
The Southern Hebrides agency states that "while farming and, to a lesser extent, fishing, continue to provide most of the income of Tiree, tourism plays an increasing part in the island’s economy". The fertile machair lands of the island provide for good quality farming and crofting

Tiree Community Development Trust owns and operates a 950 kW community-owned wind turbine project known as Tilley. This was the fourth such large-scale project in Scotland. The first three projects were on Gigha and Westray and at Findhorn Ecovillage. The Argyll Array, an offshore wind farm development was proposed for development around Skerryvore but was subsequently abandoned.

The island is a popular destination for family holidays. Tourists are attracted by the beaches, its many crofts, "traditional blackhouses and white houses, many retaining their charming thatched roofs, as well as unique ‘pudding houses’ where white mortar contrasts with dark stone". A full dozen blackhouses, thatched with local marram grass, can still be found on Tiree.

Tiree is popular for windsurfing. The island regularly hosts the Tiree Wave Classic and was the venue for the Corona Extra PWA World Cup Finals in 2007. It is visited regularly by surfing clubs, including Edinburgh, Aberdeen and Glasgow university clubs. There is a radar station which tracks civil aircraft.

The island's population was 653 as recorded by the 2011 census a drop of over 15% since 2001, when there were 770 usual residents. During the same period Scottish island populations as a whole grew by 4% to 103,702.

Tiree has a rich distilling history and is home to a distillery, which was set up to re-establish the island's whisky heritage and, is producing Tyree Gin. The distillery has plans to make Scotch Whisky. An April 2020 article about the Tiree Whisky Company, producers of Tyree Gin, states that it began making gin on the island again in 2019 but does not mention a plan to make whisky on the island. The company is said to be the first legal distillery on the island in over 200 years; distilling had been banned in 1802. In 2020, the company was marketing a Speyside whisky, The Cairnsmuir, but not made on Tiree.

Culture and media 
The island is known for its vernacular architecture, including a 'blackhouse' and 'white houses', many retaining their traditional thatched roofs, and for its unique 'pudding houses' or 'spotted houses' where only the mortar is painted white.

Tiree has a declining but still considerable percentage of Gaelic speakers. In 2001, 368 residents (47.8%) spoke Gaelic.  By 2011 the figure had decreased to 240 (38.3%), still the highest percentage of speakers in the Inner Hebrides.

Since 2010, the island has hosted the annual Tiree Music Festival, held in Crossapol in the fields beside the community hall 'An Talla'. In 2012, when Tiree appeared in the BBC Programme Coast for a second time, the actions of RAF weather forecasters, flying hazardous missions far out into the storms of the Atlantic during World War II, were discussed.

Tiree is mentioned in the traditional Scottish song titled "Dark Island", which tells a tale of a ship leaving Oban and passing the "isle of my childhood", Tiree. Tiree is mentioned in Enya's 1988 single "Orinoco Flow". Tiree is also referenced in the song "Western Ocean" by Skipinnish, a traditional Scottish band co-founded by local Tirisdeach (Tiresian) Angus MacPhail.

The album won the Community Project of the Year award at the Scots Trad Music Awards in 2017.

People connected to Tiree
Iain mac Ailein, or John MacLean, (1787-1848), was a Tiree bard and highly important figure in both Scottish Gaelic literature and that of Canadian Gaelic. According to Robert Dunbar, the Gaels of Tiree have a very long history of producing highly gifted songwriters and poets, but "MacLean is ...considered by some to be the greatest of the Tiree bards."

See also 

 List of islands of Scotland
 List of Sites of Special Scientific Interest in Mull, Coll and Tiree

Notes

References

Further reading 

 Banks, Noel, (1977) Six Inner Hebrides. Newton Abbott: David & Charles.

External links 

Community Website – The Tiree Community Website
Summit of Tiree – a computer-generated panorama
Gordon Scott's website keeps people up to date with Tiree events
Tiree Images  – large collection of photographs
Vaul Golf Club – Golf on Isle of Tiree
Tiree Baptist Church – Tiree Baptist Church
Tiree Wave Classic – The Tiree Wave Classic
An Tirisdeach – The Island's local paper
Tiree Music Festival – The Island's Annual Music Festival
Tiree Community Development Trust - Community Led Development Organisation
An Iodhlann - Tiree's Historical Centre - Museum & Archive
Tyree Gin - Tyree Gin
Tiree Tea - Tiree Tea

 
Islands of the Inner Hebrides
Islands of Argyll and Bute
Surfing locations in Scotland